Orphnolechia is a genus of moths in the subfamily Stenomatinae.

Species
Orphnolechia acridula (Meyrick, 1918)
Orphnolechia anaphanta (Meyrick, 1925)
Orphnolechia crypsiphragma Meyrick, 1909
Orphnolechia neastra (Meyrick, 1915)

References

 
Stenomatinae
Taxa named by Edward Meyrick
Ditrysia genera